The Been people, also known as Bind, are a Hindi-speaking community that live in Srimangal, Bangladesh. They were transported to the Sylhet region in the nineteenth century by the British in order to work as tea garden labourers - an occupation which they continue to live by today. They are originally from the border region between West Bengal and Bihar. They are Hindus and maintain a distinct identity in addition to their Bangladeshi national identity, due to cultural, linguistic, geographical and historical reasons. Many have adopted the Bengali language; although only 10% of the community are actually literate in the language.

See also
History of Sylhet

References

Indo-Aryan peoples
People from Srimangal Upazila
Ethnic groups in Bangladesh

ur:بین